Dr. Bhimrao Ambedkar University, formerly Agra University, is an Autonomous University located in Agra, Uttar Pradesh, India. The university is named after Bhimrao Ambedkar, Indian scholar, social reformer, and the architect of the Indian Constitution.

Institute of Engineering and Technology
The Institute of Engineering and Technology Khandari, Agra (I.E.T. Khandari, Agra), situated at the Khandari campus in the city of Agra, was established in 1998 and is the engineering institute of the university.

Institute of Social Sciences
The Institute of Social Sciences (ISS), Agra is situated at Paliwal campus in university premises.

Notable alumni

Charan Singh, former Prime Minister of India
Atal Bihari Vajpayee, former Prime Minister of India
Mulayam Singh Yadav, former CM
 Santosh Gangwar, Chairperson, Committee on public undertakings
Dronamraju Krishna Rao, geneticist
Ganesh Prasad Pandey, organic chemist, Shanti Swarup Bhatnagar laureate
Hirdaya Behari Mathur, physical chemist, Shanti Swarup Bhatnagar laureate
Hridyanath Kunzru, Freedom Fighter, First National Commissioner of Bharat Scouts and Guides & first President of the Children's Film Society.
Javed Agrewala, molecular biologist, Shanti Swarup Bhatnagar laureate
Manapurathu Verghese George, photochemist, Shanti Swarup Bhatnagar laureate
Om Dutt Gulati, pharmacologist, Shanti Swarup Bhatnagar and B. C. Roy laureate
Shyam Sunder Kapoor, nuclear physicist, Shanti Swarup Bhatnagar laureate
Virendra Singh, theoretical physicist, Shanti Swarup Bhatnagar laureate
Y. D. Sharma, molecular biologist, Shanti Swarup Bhatnagar laureate
Gopal Krishna, radio astronomer, Shanti Swarup Bhatnagar laureate
Rajendra Yadav, pioneer of the Hindi literary movement
Aziz Qureshi, former governor
Shafiqur Rahman Barq, MP (Uttar pradesh)
Ramakant Yadav, ex-VC of Uttar Pradesh University of Medical Sciences
Dev Swarup, VC of Dr. Bhimrao Ambedkar Law University
Ram Gopal Yadav, MP (Rajya Sabha)
Dhatri Saran Mathur, I.C.S and Chief Justice of Allahabad High Court
Devendra Singh Yadav, former MP
 Ajit Doval, Current National Security Advisor to the Prime Minister of India, with the precedence of a Cabinet Minister
H. N. Kunzru, Indian freedom fighter
Raj Babbar, Indian film actor and politician
Ibn-e-Safi, Urdu-language novelist, author of Jasoosi Duniya series. 
Narinder Singh Kapany, Physicist known as 'Father of Fibre Optics', and Padma Vibhushan awardee
Rekha Dikshit, former judge of Allahabad High Court

References

External links

 

Universities in Uttar Pradesh
Universities and colleges in Agra
Educational institutions established in 1927
1927 establishments in India